Andrea West Bendtsen (born 9 June 1999) is a Danish handball player who currently plays for Holstebro Håndbold.

She is also a part of Denmark's national recruit team in handball.

References

1999 births
Living people
Danish female handball players
FCM Håndbold players